Orpheus Myron McAdoo (4 January 1858 – 17 July 1900) was an American singer and minstrel show impresario. He toured extensively in Britain, South Africa and Australia, first with Frederick Loudin's Jubilee Singers and then with his own minstrel companies.

Early years

Orpheus McAdoo was born in Greensboro, North Carolina, on 4 January 1858.
He was the oldest child of slave parents. His mother was the only slave on the estate who could read. The family occupied a two-room cottage, presumably since they had higher status than most of the slaves on the plantation.

McAdoo attended the Hampton Institute, graduating in 1876.
For three years, he was a schoolteacher in rural Virginia, in Pulaski and Accomack counties, and for several more years he taught at the Hampton preparatory school.

While teaching, McAdoo also spent much of his time touring with the Hampton Male Quartet. Around the end of 1885, he decided to join the Fisk Jubilee Singers led by Frederick J. Loudin. This troupe had sailed for England in April 1884, and for six years toured Australia, England, India and the Far East, returning to the USA in April 1890.

Around October 1899, McAdoo and soprano Belle F. Gibbons left Loudin's group and went back to the USA. There McAdoo formed his own company, the Virginia Concert Company or Virginia Jubilee Singers.

Touring minstrel shows

The members of the new troupe included McAdoo's younger brother Eugene McAdoo, his future wife Mattie E. Allen (c. 1868-1936), Belle F. Gibbons, Madame J. Stewart Ball and Moses Hamilton Hodges. On 29 May 1890, Jubilee Singers left New York for England. The troupe then went to South Africa, opening on 30 June 1890 in the Cape Colony. The troupe received a very favorable reception. The Cape Argus said,

McAdoo's company found strong racial prejudice in South Africa, particularly in Transvaal and the Orange Free State, with a 9 p.m. curfew for blacks. The natives had to get passes for travel in the country, and were not allowed to own a business.

Orpheus McAdoo married Mattie E. Allen on 27 January 1891 at Port Elizabeth, Cape Colony.

In February 1891, President Paul Kruger saw the Jubilee Singers perform, perhaps entering a theater for the first time in his life, and was said to have been greatly moved by their rendition of Nobody knows the trouble I have seen. The company closed in South Africa on 25 January 1892.

McAdoo's company began a tour of Australia and New Zealand in 1892. The McAdoos' son Myron was born in 1893. After three years, the company returned to Cape Town on 29 June 1895.

McAdoo had some difficulties with the baritone Will Thompson and with Mamie Edwards, who both left the company to live in Kimberley. In February 1897, McAdoo went to New York to hire replacements. He returned in June 1897 with eight new artists, including dancers, a comedian and female impersonator, and a juggler. McAdoo renamed the company the "Minstrel, Vaudeville and Concert Company". In August 1897, Thompson and Edwards rejoined the company.

A sample joke from this show, adapted from the plantation to the South African frontier, was,

Last Australian tour

In 1898, the company returned to Australia. McAdoo leased the Palace Theatre, Sydney, a vaudeville house, with plans to establish a stock company there.

In April 1899, McAdoo returned to the USA to recruit members for the Georgia Minstrels and Alabama Cakewalkers. Singer Flora Batson joined the company at this time. This full-size African-American minstrel troupe toured Australia from 1899 to May 1900.

In June 1899, M.B. Curtis's All-star American Minstrels embarked on an Australian tour. Members included Billy McClain and his wife Cordelia, and Ernest Hogan. Soon after the show reached Sydney, Curtis abandoned the show and Hogan took over.

The McClains transferred to Orpheus McAdoo's Georgia Minstrels. A review of the O.M. McAdoo Georgia Minstrels show in the Brisbane Opera House in January 1900 said "The two low comedians of the company−"Billy" McClain and C.W. Walker−had their hearers in fits of laughter throughout the evening, their reappearance on the stage after their turns in the first part being always the signal for fresh outbursts of mirth. Before the interval ballads were well rendered by Madame Cordelia ... 

Orpheus McAdoo died in Sydney on 17 July 1900. He is buried in Waverley Cemetery, Sydney.

Mattie E. Allen of Columbus, Ohio provided the lyrics to "The Victory Song", set in 1919 by Frank W. Ford.

References
Notes

Citations

Sources

1858 births
1900 deaths
American musical theatre producers
African-American cultural history
19th-century American businesspeople